Delta 1 may refer to:

 Delta One, financial derivatives products that have no optionality and as such have a delta very close to one
 Delta One (business class), premier business class product for Delta Air Lines.
 Fairey Delta 1, a research airplane made by Fairey Aviation
 Delta (rocket family), pre-Delta-II (Delta I) rockets 
 Delta-class submarine, including the Delta-I subclass
 Delta 1 (glider), a German glider
 Delta I (computer system), a 1960s computer system installed at the United States military's Space Defense Center

See also
 Delta (disambiguation)
 One (disambiguation)
 I (disambiguation)